Ilaria Scarcella (born 6 July 1993) is an Italian swimmer who competed at the 2009 World Aquatics Championships and won a silver medal at senior level with the national team at the 2015 Summer Universiade.

Biography
Scarcella is an athlete of the Gruppo Sportivo Fiamme Oro, before she was an athlete of Nuotatori Rivarolesi and than, she was a member of the another Italian military sports body, the Gruppo Sportivo Fiamme Oro, from 2010 to 2016.

National titles
She won two national championships at individual senior level.
Italian Swimming Championships
100 m breaststroke: 2009
200 m breaststroke: 2009

See also
 Italy at the 2015 World Aquatics Championships

References

External links

 

1993 births
Living people
Italian female swimmers
Italian female freestyle swimmers
Universiade gold medalists for Italy
Sportspeople from Genoa
Swimmers of Fiamme Oro
Swimmers of Fiamme Gialle
Universiade medalists in swimming
Medalists at the 2015 Summer Universiade